Proposition 21, an initiative statute for local rent control officially called the Expands Local Governments’ Authority to Enact Rent Control on Residential Property, was a California ballot proposition that appeared on the ballot for the general election on November 3, 2020 and was rejected. If approved, it would allow local governments to establish rent control on residential properties that have been occupied for over 15 years. It would also allow landlords who own no more than two homes to exempt themselves from such policies. This would essentially repeal some of the provisions in the 1995 Costa–Hawkins Rental Housing Act. Proposition 21 was rejected by 60% of California voters, just like Proposition 10 was before it.

In the 2018 California election, a measure to completely repeal the Costa-Hawkins Rental Housing Act, known as Proposition 10, was on the ballot, but failed to pass, as nearly 60% of voters rejected that measure. The same activists who sponsored Proposition 10, who had links to the AIDS Healthcare Foundation, tried again with another ballot measure to reform the Costa-Hawkins Act, due to their failure to completely repeal it in 2018. The AIDS Healthcare Foundation spent $40 million in support of Proposition 21 and the opposition spent $85 million.

As of 2017, over seventeen million Californians are renters. This totals about 45% of the state's population. Further, California boasts the highest rental costs in the nation. Per the Rose Institute of State and Local Government, "the state’s [California's] median rent is $1,447, whereas the United States’ is $1,012."

Polls

Results 

California voters rejected Proposition 21 by a margin of 59.9% to 40.1%. This is the second time that California voters have rejected a rent-control measure at the ballot box. In 2018, California voters rejected Proposition 10, a similar rent-control measure, by a similar margin of 59% to 41%.

This loss came as Californians experienced record high rents in September 2020, and renters feared COVID-19 related evictions. Supporters of Proposition 21 expressed regret over the defeat.  René Moya, campaign director for Yes on 21, said, “We are disappointed, although not completely surprised, that Prop. 21 fell short at the ballot box tonight.”

Notes

References

External links 

 Official Voter Information Guide
 Official Yes on Prop 21 campaign website
 Official No on Prop 21 campaign website

2020 California ballot propositions
Housing legislation in the United States
Rent regulation
Housing in California